Bellaria – Igea Marina is a town and comune in the province of Rimini, northern Italy, with approximately 18,300 inhabitants.

References

Cities and towns in Emilia-Romagna